This article is a list of notable women's rights activists, arranged alphabetically by modern country names and by the names of the persons listed.

Afghanistan
Amina Azimi – disabled women's rights advocate
Hasina Jalal  – women's empowerment activist
Quhramaana Kakar – Senior Strategic Advisor for Conciliation Resources
Masuada Karokhi (born 1962) – Member of Parliament and women’s rights campaigner

Albania

Parashqevi Qiriazi (1880–1970) – teacher
Sevasti Qiriazi (1871–1949) – pioneer of female education
Urani Rumbo (1895–1936) – feminist, teacher, and playwright

Algeria
Aïcha Lemsine (born 1942) – French-language writer and women's rights activist
Ahlam Mosteghanemi (born 1953) – writer and sociologist

Argentina
Virginia Bolten (1870–1960) – Argentine journalist as well as an anarchist and feminist activist of German descent
Raymunda Torres y Quiroga – 19th-century Argentine writer and women's rights activist
Azucena Villaflor (1924–1977) – social activist, a founder of the human rights association Mothers of the Plaza de Mayo

Australia

Thelma Bate (1904–1984) – community leader, advocate for inclusion of Aboriginals in Country Women's Association
Rosie Batty (born 1962) – 2015 Australian of the Year and family violence campaigner
Sandra Bloodworth – labour historian, socialist activist, co-founder of Trotskyist Socialist Alternative, editor of Marxist Left Review
Eva Cox (born 1938) – sociologist and feminist active in politics and social services, member of Women's Electoral Lobby, social commentator on women in power and at work, and social justice
Zelda D'Aprano (born 1928) – trade unionist, feminist, in 1969 chained herself to doors of Commonwealth Building over equal pay
Louisa Margaret Dunkley (1866–1927) – telegraphist and labour organizer
Elizabeth Evatt (born 1933) – legal reformist, jurist, critic of Australia's Sex Discrimination Act, first Australian in United Nations Commission on Human Rights
Miles Franklin (1879–1954) – writer and feminist
Vida Goldstein (1869–1949) – early Australian feminist campaigning for women's suffrage and social reform, first woman in British Empire to stand for national election
Germaine Greer (born 1939) – author of The Female Eunuch, academic and social commentator
Bella Guerin (1858–1923) – first woman to graduate from an Australian university, Guerin was a prominent socialist feminist (although with periods of public dispute) within the Australian Labor Party
Louisa Lawson (1848–1920) – feminist, suffragist, author, founder of The Dawn, pro-republican federalist
Fiona Patten (born 1964) – leader of Australian Sex Party, lobbyist for personal freedoms and progressive lifestyles
Michelle Payne (born 1985) – first female winner of Melbourne Cup and an advocate of increased presence of women in sport
Eileen Powell (1913–1997) – trade unionist, women's activist and contributor to the Equal Pay for Equal Work decision
Millicent Preston-Stanley (1883–1955) – first female member of New South Wales Legislative Assembly, campaigner for custodial rights of mothers in divorce and for women's health care
Elizabeth Anne Reid (born 1942) – world's first women's affairs adviser to head of government (Gough Whitlam), active in the United Nations and on HIV
Bessie Rischbieth (1874–1967) – earliest female appointee to any court (honorary, Perth Children's Court, 1915), active against the Australian government practice of taking Aboriginal children from their mothers (Stolen Generation)
Jessie Street (1889–1970) – Australian suffragette, feminist and human rights campaigner influential in labour rights and early days of the UN
Anne Summers (born 1945) – women's rights activist in politics and media, women's advisor to Labor premier Paul Keating, editor of Ms. magazine (NY)
Mary Hynes Swanton (1861–1940) – Australian women's rights and trade unionist

Austria
Auguste Fickert (1855–1910) – feminist and social reformer
Marianne Hainisch (1839–1936) – activist, exponent of women's right to work and education
Bertha Pappenheim (1859–1936) – Austrian-Jewish feminist, founder of the German Jewish Women's Association

Belgium
Marguerite Coppin (1867–1931) – female Poet Laureate of Belgium and advocate of women's rights
Christine Loudes (1972–2016) – proponent of gender equality and women's rights
Frédérique Petrides (1903–1983) – Belgian-American pioneer female orchestral conductor, activist and editor of Women in Music
Marie Popelin (1846–1913) – lawyer, feminist campaigner, leader of the Belgian League for Women's Rights

Bosnia & Herzegovina 

 Indira Bajramović – Roma activist, director of the Association of Roma Women from Tuzla

Botswana
Unity Dow (born 1959) – judge and writer, plaintiff in case allowing children of mixed parentage to be deemed nationals

Brazil

Clara Ant (born 1948) – architect and political activist for the Partido dos Trabalhadores 
Albertina de Oliveira Costa (born 1943) – feminist activist, member of the Nacional dos Direitos da Mulher (National Council for Women's Rights)
Jaqueline Jesus (born 1978) – LGBT rights activist
Lily Marinho (1921–2011) – UNESCO Goodwill Ambassador for Brazil from 1999 TO 2011
Míriam Martinho (born 1954) – leading feminist journalist and LGBT rights activist, known for her pioneering in Lesbian Feminism 
Laudelina de Campos Melo (1904–1991) – created the first trade association for domestic workers in Brazil
Lucia Nader (born 1977) – human rights activist
Matilde Ribeiro (born 1960) – political activist, feminist and part of the anit-racism movement in Brazil, as well as former Chief Minister of SEPPIR, a government agency promoting racial equality in Brazil
Alzira Rufino (born 1949) – feminist, part of both the Black Movement and the Black Women's Movement
Heleieth Saffioti (1934–2010) – feminist activist and sociology professor
Miêtta Santiago (1903–1995) – suffragist, feminit activist, writer and poet
Viviane Senna (born 1957) – president of the Instituto Ayrton Senna 
Yara Yavelberg (1943–1971) – university lecturer and part of the resistance against military dictatorship in Brazil

Bulgaria

Dimitrana Ivanova (1881–1960) – educational reformer and suffragist
Ekaterina Karavelova (1860–1947) – suffragist and women's rights activist
Anna Karima (1871–1949) – suffragist and women's rights activist
Eugenia Kisimova (1831–1885) – feminist, philanthropist, women's rights activist
Kina Konova (1872–1952) – publicist and suffragist
Julia Malinova (1869–1953) – suffragist and founder of the Bulgarian Women's Union

Canada

Edith Archibald (1854–1936) – suffragist, writer, promoter of Maritime Women's Christian Temperance Union, National Council of Women of Canada and Local Council of Women of Halifax
Laura Borden (1861–1940) – president of the Local Council of Women of Halifax
Thérèse Casgrain (1896–1981) – suffragette, reformer, feminist, politician and senator, mainly active in Quebec
Françoise David (born 1948) – politician, feminist activist
Emily Howard Stowe (1831–1903) – physician, advocate of women's inclusion in medical profession, founder of Canadian Women's Suffrage Association
Marie Lacoste-Gérin-Lajoie (1867–1945) – suffragette, self-taught jurist
Nellie McClung (1873–1951) – feminist and suffragist, part of The Famous Five (Canada)
Jamie McIntosh (21st century) – lawyer and women's rights activist
Eliza Ritchie (1856–1933) – prominent suffragist, executive member of Local Council of Women of Halifax 
Léa Roback (1903–2000) – feminist and workers' union activist tied with communist party
Idola Saint-Jean (1880–1945) – suffragette, journalist
Mary Two-Axe Earley (1911–1996) – indigenous women's rights activist

Cape Verde
Isaura Gomes (born 1944)

Chad
Lydie Beassemda (born c. 1967)
Céline Narmadji (born 1964)

Chile
Alicia Herrera Rivera (1928–2013) – feminist lawyer and minister of the Court of Appeals of Santiago
María Rivera Urquieta (born 1894) – professor and feminist

China

Cai Chang (1900–1990) – politician, first chair of the All-China Women's Federation
Chen Xiefen (1883–1923) – feminist, revolutionary and journalist 
Fok Hing-tong (1872–1957)
He Xiangning (1878–1972)
Huixing (educator) (1871–1905)
Jiang Shufang (1867–1928) – school pioneer
Li Maizi (born 1989)
Lin Zongsu (1878–1944) 
Liu-Wang Liming (1897–1970)
Lü Jinghua (born 1960)
Mao Hengfeng (born 1961)
Miao Boying
Nurungul Tohti (born 1980)
Qiu Yufang (1871–1904)
Wan Shaofen (born 1930)
Wang Huiwu (1898–1993)
Wei Tingting (born 1989) 
Xiang Jingyu
Xie Xuehong (1901–1970)
Ye Haiyan (born 1975)
Zheng Churan

Colombia
 Juana de J. Sarmiento (1899–1979), Colombian politician, activist

Croatia
Jelica Belović-Bernardzikowska (1870–1946)

Democratic Republic of Congo
Julienne Lusenge – women's activist recognized for advocating for survivors of wartime sexual violence

Denmark

Sophie Alberti (1846–1947) – pioneering women's rights activist and a leading member of Kvindelig Læseforening (Women Readers' Association)
Widad Akrawi (born 1969) – writer and doctor, advocate for gender equality, women's empowerment and participation in peace-building and post-conflict governance
Johanne Andersen (1862–1925), active in Funen and in the Danish Women's Society
Ragnhild Nikoline Andersen (1907–1990) – trade unionist, Communist party politician and Stutthof prisoner
Signe Arnfred (born 1944), sociologist specializing in gender studies
Matilde Bajer (1840–1934) – women's rights activist and pacifist
Annestine Beyer (1795–1884) – pioneer of women's education
Anne Bruun (1853–1934) – schoolteacher and women's rights activist
Esther Carstensen (1873–1955) – women right's activist, journal editor, active in the Danish Women's Society
Severine Casse (1805–1898) – women's rights activist, successful in fighting for a wife's right to dispose of her earnings
Ulla Dahlerup (born 1942) – writer, women's rights activist, member of the Danish Red Stocking Movement
Thora Daugaard (1874–1951) – women's rights activist, pacifist, editor
Henni Forchhammer (1863–1955) – educator, feminist, peace activist
Inger Gamburg (1892–1979) – trades unionist, Communist politician
Suzanne Giese (1946–2012) – writer, women's rights activist, prominent member of the Red Stocking Movement
Bente Hansen (born 1940) – writer, supporter of the Red Stocking Movement
Eline Hansen (1859–1919) – feminist and peace activist
Eva Hemmer Hansen (1913–1983) – writer and feminist 
Estrid Hein (1873–1956) – ophthalmologist, women's rights activist, pacifist
Dagmar Hjort (1860–1902) – schoolteacher, writer, women's rights activist
Thora Ingemann Drøhse (1867–1948) – temperance campaigner and women's rights activist in Randers
Katja Iversen (born 1969) – author, advisor, women's rights advocate, President of Women Deliver 2014-2020
Thyra Jensen (1865–1949) – writer and women's rights activist in southern Schleswig
Erna Juel-Hansen (1845–1922) – novelist, early women's rights activist
Lene Koch (born 1947), gender studies researcher
Anna Laursen (1845–1911) – educator, head of the Aarhus branch of the Danish Women's Society
Anna Lohse (1866–1942), Odense schoolteacher and women's rights activist
Line Luplau (1823–1891) – feminist, suffragist, founder of the Danish Women's Suffrage Society
Elisabeth Møller Jensen (born 1946) – historian, feminist, director of Kvinfo from 1990 to 2014
Thora Knudsen (1861–1950), nurse, women's rights activist and philanthropist
Nynne Koch (1915–2001), pioneering women's studies researcher
Else Moltke (1888–1986), writer and leader of women's discussion group in Copenhagen
Elna Munch (1871–1845) – feminist, politician, co-founder of the Danish Association for Women's Suffrage
Louise Nørlund (1854–1919) – feminist, pacifist, founder of the Danish Women's Suffrage Society
Birgitte Berg Nielsen (1861–1951) – equal rights activist, educator
Charlotte Norrie (1855–1940) – nurse, women's rights activist, voting rights campaigner
Voldborg Ølsgaard (1877–1939) – women's rights and peace activist
Tania Ørum (born 1945), women's research activist, literary historian
Thora Pedersen (1875–1954) – educator, school inspector, women's rights activist who fought for equal pay for men and women
Johanne Rambusch (1865–1944) – feminist, politician, co-founder of the radical suffrage association Landsforbundet for Kvinders Valgret
Caja Rude (1884–1949), novelist, journalist and women's rights activist
Vibeke Salicath (1861–1921) – philanthropist, feminist, editor, politician 
Astrid Stampe Feddersen (1852–1930) – chaired first Scandinavian meeting on women's rights
Karen Syberg (born 1945) – writer, feminist, co-founder of the Red Stocking Movement
Caroline Testman (1839–1919) – feminist, co-founder of Dansk Kvindesamfund
Ingeborg Tolderlund (1848–1935) – women's rights activist and suffragist
Clara Tybjerg (1864–1941) – women's rights activist, pacifist
Anna Westergaard (1882–1964) – railway official, trade unionist, women's rights activist, politician
Louise Wright (1861–1935) – philanthropist, feminist, peace activist
Natalie Zahle (1827–1913) – pioneer of women's education
Else Zeuthen (1897–1975) – Danish pacifist, women's rights activist and politician

East Timor
Magdalena Bidau Soares – ex-guerrilla, peace activist

Ecuador
Rosa Zárate y Ontaneda (1763–1813) – feminist and independence activist

Egypt

Qasim Amin (1863–1908) – jurist, early advocate of women's rights in society
Soraya Bahgat (born 1983) – Egyptian-Finnish women's rights advocate, social entrepreneur and founder of Tahrir Bodyguard
Ihsan El-Kousy (born 1900) – headmistress, writer and rights activist
Nawal el-Saadawi (1931–2021) – writer and doctor, advocate of women's health and equality
Entisar Elsaeed (fl. 2000s) – activist fighting female genital mutilation and domestic abuse
Engy Ghozlan (born 1985) – coordinator of campaigns against sexual harassment
Hoda Shaarawi (1879–1947) – feminist organizer of Mubarrat Muhammad Ali (women's social service organization), Union of Educated Egyptian Women, and Wafdist Women's Central Committee, founder president of Egyptian Feminist Union

Estonia
Elisabeth Howen (1834–1923) – women's educational pioneer

Finland

Hanna Andersin (1861–1914) – educator, feminist
Soraya Bahgat (born 1983) – see Egypt
Elisabeth Blomqvist (1827–1901) – pioneering female educator
Minna Canth (1844–1897) – writer, women's rights proponent
Adelaïde Ehrnrooth (1826–1905) – feminist, writer, early fighter for voting rights
Alexandra Gripenberg (1857–1913) – writer, women's rights activist, treasurer of the International Council of Women
Lucina Hagman (1853–1946) – feminist, politician, pacifist, president of the League of Finnish Feminists
Rosina Heikel (1842–1929) – feminist, first medical doctor in Finland
Alma Hjelt (1853–1907) – gymnast, women's rights activist, chair of the Finnish women's association Suomen Naisyhdistyksen
Hilda Käkikoski (1864–1912) – suffragist, writer, schoolteacher, early politician

France

Isnelle Amelin (1907–1994) – feminist and trade unionist from La Réunion
Hubertine Auclert (1848–1914) – feminist activist, suffragette
Simone de Beauvoir (1908–1986) – philosopher, writer
Marie-Thérèse Lucidor Corbin (1749–1834) – French Creole activist and abolitionist in the French colonies
Charles Fourier (1772–1837) – philosopher
Françoise Giroud (1916–2003) – journalist, writer, politician
Olympe de Gouges (1748–1793) – playwright and political activist who wrote the 1791 Declaration of the Rights of Woman and of the Female Citizen
Blanche Moria (1858–1927) – sculptor, educator, feminist
Ndella Paye (born c. 1974) – Senegal-born militant Afro-feminist and Muslim theologian
Maria Pognon (1844–1925) – writer, feminist, suffragist, pacifist
Alphonse Rebière (1842–1900) – author of Les Femmes dans la science and advocate for women's scientific abilities
Léonie Rouzade (1839–1916) – journalist, novelist, feminist
Anne-Josèphe Théroigne de Méricourt (1762–1817) – politician
Flora Tristan (1803–1844) French-Peruvian activist, early advocate of socialism and feminism
Louise Weiss (1893–1983) – journalist, writer, politician

Germany

Jenny Apolant (1874–1925) – Jewish feminist, suffragist
Ruth Bré (c. 1862/67–1911) – writer, advocate of matrilineality and women's rights, founder of Bund für Mutterschutz (League for Maternity Leave)
Johanna Elberskirchen (1864–1943) - feminist and activist for women's rights, gays and lesbians
Johanna von Evreinov (1844–1919) – Russian-born German feminist writer, pioneering female lawyer and editor
 Lida Gustava Heymann (1868–1943) – feminist, pacifist and women's rights activist
Luise Koch (1860–1934) – educator, women's rights activist, suffragist, politician
Helene Lange (1848–1930) – educator, pioneering women's rights activist, suffragist
Sigrid Metz-Göckel (born 1940) – sociologist, gender studies academic 
Ursula G. T. Müller (born 1940) – sociologist, gender studies academic 
Louise Otto-Peters (1819–1895) – suffragist, women's rights activist, writer
Alice Salomon (1872–1948) – social reformer, women's rights activist, educator, writer
Käthe Schirmacher (1865–1930) – early women's rights activist, writer
Auguste Schmidt (1833–1902) – pioneering women's rights activist, educator, journalist
Alice Schwarzer (born 1942) – journalist and publisher of the magazine Emma
 Gesine Spieß (1945–2016), educationalist specializing in gender studies
Marie Stritt (1855–1928) – women's rights activist, suffragist, co-founder of the International Alliance of Women
Johanna Vogt (1862–1944) – suffragist, first woman on the city council of Kassel starting in 1919.
Marianne Weber (1870–1954) – sociologist, women's rights activist, writer
Clara Zetkin (1857–1933) – Marxist theorist, women's rights activist, suffragist, politician

Ghana
Annie Jiagge (1918–1996) – lawyer, judge, women's rights activist, drafted Declaration on the Elimination of Discrimination Against Women, co-founded Women's World Banking

Greece
Kalliroi Parren (1861–1940) – founder of the Greek women's movement
Avra Theodoropoulou (1880–1963) – music critic, pianist, suffragist, women's rights activist, nurse

Greenland
Aviâja Egede Lynge (born 1974), educator, activist for indigenous peoples and women's rights
Henriette Rasmussen (1950–2017), educator, journalist, women's rights activist and politician

Hungary
Clotilde Apponyi (1867–1942) – suffragist
Enikő Bollobás (born 1952) – academic specializing in women's studies
Vilma Glücklich (1872–1927) – educational reformer and women's rights activist
Teréz Karacs (1808–1892) – writer and women's rights activist
Rosika Schwimmer (1877–1948) – feminist, suffragist, World Peace Prize (1937)
Éva Takács (1780–1845) – writer and feminist
Blanka Teleki (1806–1862) – feminist and advocate of female education
Pálné Veres (1815–1895) – founder of Hungarian National Association for Women's Education

Iceland
Ingibjörg H. Bjarnason (1867–1941) – politician, suffragist, schoolteacher, gymnast
Bríet Bjarnhéðinsdóttir (1856–1940) – activist for women's liberation and women's suffrage
Þórunn Jónassen (1850–1922) – active member of the women's movement
Katrín Magnússon (1858–1932) – promoter of women's voting rights and women's education

India

Angellica Aribam (born 1992) – political activist, founder of Femme First Foundation
Annie Basil (1911–1995) – Iranian-Indian activist for Armenian women
Yogita Bhayana – Indian anti-sexual violence activist and head of People Against Rape in India
Margaret "Gretta" Cousins (1878–1954) – Irish-Indian suffragist, established All India Women's Conference, co-founded Irish Women's Franchise League
Madhusree Dutta (born 1959) – co-founder of Majlis, Mumbai, author, cultural activist, filmmaker, curator
Rehana Fathima (born 1986) – women's rights activist
Ruchira Gupta (born 1964) – journalist and activist. She is the founder of Apne Aap, a non-governmental organization that works for women's rights and the eradication of sex trafficking
Nazli Gegum (1874–1968) – Indian girl education activist
Kirthi Jayakumar (born 1987) – founder of The Red Elephant Foundation, rights activist, campaigner against violence against women
Shruti Kapoor – women's rights activist, economist, social entrepreneur
Sunitha Krishnan (born 1972) – Indian social activist, co-founder of Prajwala which assists trafficked women, girls and transgender people in finding shelter, education and employment
Subodh Markandeya – senior advocate
Swati Maliwal (born 1984) - Women's activist, had several demands, including the passage of an ordinance requiring the death penalty for individuals who rape children under age 12, recruiting police under United Nations standards and demanding accountability of the police
Manasi Pradhan (born 1962) – founder of nationwide Honour for Women National Campaign against violence to women
Mamatha Raghuveer Achanta (born 1967) – women's and child rights activist, chair of Child Welfare Committee, Warangal District, active in A.P. State Commission for Protection of Child Rights, founder director of Tharuni, focusing on girl-child and women empowerment

Indonesia
Electronita Duan – founder of Politeknik Pembangunan Halmahera
Raden Adjeng Kartini (1879–1904) – Javanese advocate for native Indonesian women, critic of polygamy and lack of women's education
Valentina Sagala (born 1977) – women's rights activist
Nani Soewondo-Soerasno (born 1918)  – lawyer, suffragist, and women's rights activist.

Iran

Mahboubeh Abbasgholizadeh (born 1958) – women's rights activist, founder of ZananTV and NGO Training Center
Parvin Ardalan (born 1967) – women's rights activist
Bibi Khanoom Astarabadi (1859–1921) – writer
Annie Basil (1911–1995) – Iranian-Indian activist for Armenian women
Sediqeh Dowlatabadi (1882–1962) – journalist and women's rights activist
Shirin Ebadi (born 1947) – activist, Nobel Peace Prize winner for efforts for rights of women and children
Mohtaram Eskandari (1895–1924) – women's rights activist, founder of "Jam'iat e nesvan e vatan-khah" (Society of Patriotic Women)
Soheila Hejab (born 1990)
Sheema Kalbasi (born 1972) – writer, advocate for human rights and gender equality
Saba Kord Afshari
Noushin Ahmadi Khorasani (born 1970) – women's rights activist
Shadi Sadr (born 1975) – women's rights activist
Shahla Sherkat (born 1956) – journalist
Táhirih (died 1852) – Bábí poet, theologian, exponent of women's rights in 19th century
Roya Toloui (born 1966) – women's rights activist
Rayehe Mozafarian (born 1986) – women's rights activist, author, documentary filmmaker

Ireland

Hilary Boyle (1899–1988) – journalist, broadcaster, and activist
Margaret "Gretta" Cousins (1878–1954): see India.
Anna Haslam (1829–1922) – early women's movement figure, founded the Dublin Women's Suffrage Association
Francis Hutcheson (1694–1746) – philosopher born to activist family of Scots Presbyterians, opponent of slavery and advocate of women's rights
 Sarah Winstedt (1886–1972) – physician, surgeon and suffragist

Israel

 Ketzia Alon (born 1971) – academic, social activist, Mizrahi feminist, art curator and critic; one of the founders of the Ahoti – for Women in Israel movement
 Esther Eillam (born 1939) – founder of the Feminist Movement organization; Mizrahi second wave and Mizrahi feminism activist
 Carmen Elmakiyes (born 1979) – social and political activist, Mizrahi feminist; works on behalf of women in public housing 
 Marcia Freedman (born 1938) – founder of Israel's feminist movement (1971); politician, social activist and writer 
 Anat Hoffman (born 1954) – executive director, Israel Religious Action Center; director and founding member, Women of the Wall
 Shula Keshet (born 1959) – social and political activist and entrepreneur, Mizrahi feminist, artist, curator, writer, educator, and publisher; one of the founders and the executive director of the Ahoti – for Women in Israel
 Vicki Knafo (born 1960) – social activist; led the 2003 single-mothers struggle against austerity decrees 
 Reut Naggar (born 1983) – producer, cultural entrepreneur and social activist, mainly focusing on LGBT and women's rights
 Vicki Shiran (1947–2004) – one of the founders of the Mizrahi feminism movement
 Iris Stern Levi (born 1953) – activist for rehabilitation of trafficked women

Italy
Alma Dolens (1869–1948) – pacifist, suffragist and journalist, founder of several women's organizations
Linda Malnati (1855–1921) – women's rights activist, trade unionist, suffragist, pacifist and writer
Anna Maria Mozzoni (1837–1920) – pioneering women's rights activist and suffragist
Eugenia Rasponi Murat (1873–1958) – women's rights activist and open lesbian who fought for civil protections.
Gabriella Rasponi Spalletti (1853–1931) – feminist, educator and philanthropist, founder of the National Council of Italian Women in 1903
Laura Terracina (1519–c.1577) – widely published poet, writer, protested violence against women and promoted women's writing

Japan
Raicho Hiratsuka (1886–1971)
Sayaka Osakabe (born 1978)
Umeko Tsuda (1864–1929)
Yajima Kajiko (1833–1925)

Kazakhstan 

 Bakhytzhan Toregozhina (born 1962)

Kenya
Nice Nailantei Leng'ete (born 1991) – advocate for alternative rite of passage (ARP) for girls in Africa and campaigning to stop female genital mutilation (FGM).
Wangari Maathai (1940–2011) – social, environmental and political activist, the first African woman to win the Nobel Peace Prize

Latvia
 Berta Pīpiņa (1883–1942)

Lebanon
Lydia Canaan
Laure Moghaizel (1929–1997) – lawyer and women's rights advocate

Libya
Alaa Murabit (born 1989) – physician, advocate of inclusive security, peace-building and post-conflict governance

Lithuania
Felicija Bortkevičienė
Sofija Kymantaitė-Čiurlionienė
Ona Mašiotienė

Luxembourg
Marguerite Mongenast-Servais (1885–1925)
Netty Probst (1903–1990)
Catherine Schleimer-Kill (1884–1973)
Marguerite Thomas-Clement (1886–1979)

Mali 

Jacqueline Ki-Zerbo (1933–2015) – activist, nationalist and educator

Mauritania 

 Zeinebou Mint Taleb Moussa

Netherlands
Ayaan Hirsi Ali (born 1969) – see Stomalia.
Wilhelmina Drucker (1847–1925) – politician and writer
Mariane van Hogendorp (1834–1909)
Mietje Hoitsema (1847–1934)
Cornélie Huygens (1848–1902) – writer, social democrat and feminist
Aletta Jacobs (1854–1929) – physician and women's suffrage activist
Charlotte Jacobs
Jeltje Kemper
Selma Meyer
Anette Poelman
Cornelia Ramondt-Hirschmann

Namibia
Monica Geingos
Gwen Lister
Rosa Namises

New Zealand
Kate Sheppard (1848–1934) – suffragette, influential in winning voting rights for women in 1893 (first country and national election in which women have vote)

Nigeria
Priscilla Achapka – women and gender environmental activist
Osai Ojigho (born 1976) – human rights and gender equality advocate
Funmilayo Ransome-Kuti (1900–1978) – women's rights activist

Norway

Marit Aarum (1903–1956), economist, politician, activist
Irene Bauer (1945–2016), government official, activist
Anna Louise Beer (1924–2010), lawyer, judge, activist
Margunn Bjørnholt (born 1958), sociologist, economist, gender researcher, activist
Randi Blehr (1851–1928), feminist, co-founder of the Norwegian Association for Women's Rights
Karin Maria Bruzelius (born 1941), Swedish-born Norwegian judge, government official, rights activist
Nicoline Hambro (1861–1926), politician, women's rights proponent
Siri Hangeland (born 1952), politician, activist
Aasta Hansteen (1824–1908), painter, writer, feminist
Sigrun Hoel (born 1951), government official, activist
Anniken Huitfeldt (born 1969), historian, politician, reported on women's rights
Grethe Irvoll(born 1939), political supporter of women's rights
Martha Larsen Jahn (1875–1954), peace and women's activist
Dakky Kiær (1892–1980), politician, civic leader, activist
Betzy Kjelsberg (1866–1950), right's activist, suffragist, politician
Eva Kolstad (1918–1999), politician, minister, proponent of gender equality
Gina Krog (1947–1916), proponent of women's right to education, politician, editor
Berit Kvæven (born 1942), politician, activist
Aadel Lampe (1857–1944), women's rights leader, suffragist, teacher
Mimi Sverdrup Lunden (1894–1955), educator, writer, women's rights proponent
Fredrikke Mørck (1861–1934), editor, teacher, activist
Ragna Nielsen (1845–1924), headmistress, politician, activist
Marit Nybakk (born 1947), politician, activist
Amalie Øvergaard (1874–1960), women's leader, active in housewives associations
Kjellaug Pettersen (1934–2012), government official, politician, gender equality proponent
Kjellaug Pettersen (1843–1938), politician, founder of the Norwegian Women's Public Health Association
Ingerid Gjøstein Resi (1901–1955), philologist, women's rights leader, politician 
Torild Skard (born 1936), psychologist, politician, women's rights leader
Kari Skjønsberg (1926–2003), academic, writer, activist
Anna Stang (1834–1901), politician, women's rights leader
Sigrid Stray (1893–1978), lawyer, women's rights proponent
Signe Swensson (1888–1974), physician, politician, women's leader
Thina Thorleifsen (1855–1959), women's movement activist
Clara Tschudi (1856–1945), writer, biographer of women's rights activists
Vilhelmine Ullmann (1816–1915), pedagogue, writer, women's rights proponent
Grethe Værnø (born 1938), politician, writer, national and international women's rights supporter
Margrethe Vullum (1846–1918), Danish-born Norwegian journalist, writer, women's rights proponent
Fredrikke Waaler (1865–1952), musician, activist
Gunhild Ziener (1868–1937), pioneer in the women's movement, editor

Pakistan
Gulalai Ismail (born 1986) – Pashtun women's rights activist campaigning in the Pashtun Tahafuz Movement, and founder of Aware Girls
Fatima Lodhi (born 1989) – Pakistani women's rights activist who addressed colorism
Zubeida Habib Rahimtoola (1917–2015) – member of All Pakistan Women's Association
Malala Yousafzai (born 1997) – Pakistani women's rights activist shot in assassination attempt by Taliban for advocating for girls' education, now in UK

Peru
María Jesús Alvarado Rivera

Philippines
Risa Hontiveros-Baraquel – women's right activities
Liza Maza
Teresita Quintos Deles

Poland
Maria Konopnicka

Portugal
Carolina Beatriz Ângelo
Sara Beirão
Cesina Bermudes
Adelaide Cabete
Ana de Castro Osório
Elina Guimarães
Lutegarda Guimarães de Caires (1873–1935) – poet and women's rights activist
Maria Lamas

Puerto Rico
Luisa Capetillo (1879–1922) – labor union suffragette jailed for wearing pants in public

Romania
Maria Baiulescu (1860–1941) – Austro-Hungarian born Romanian writer, suffragist and women's rights activist
Calypso Botez (1880–1933) – writer, suffragist and women's rights activist
Alexandrina Cantacuzino (1876–1944) – political activist, feminist, philanthropist and diplomat
Maria Cuțarida-Crătunescu (1857–1919) – first female doctor in Romania, feminist supporter, founded the Maternal Society in 1897, and in 1899 organised the first crèche in Romania
 Cecilia Cuțescu-Storck (1879–1969) – painter and feminist
 Eugenia de Reuss Ianculescu (1866–1938) – teacher, writer, women's rights activist, suffragist
 Clara Maniu (1842–1929) – feminist, suffragist
 Elena Meissner (1867–1940) – feminist, suffragist, headed Asociația de Emancipare Civilă și Politică a Femeii Române
Sofia Nădejde (1856–1946) – writer, women's rights activist and socialist
Ella Negruzzi (1876–1948) – lawyer and women's rights activist
Elena Pop-Hossu-Longin (1862–1940) – Austro-Hungarian-born Romanian writer, journalist, suffragist and women's rights activist
Ilona Stetina (1855–1932) – pioneer educator and women's rights activist
Izabela Sadoveanu-Evan (1870–1941) – literary critic, educationist, journalist, poet and feminist militant

Russia
Anna Filosofova (1837–1912) – early women's rights activist
Evgenia Konradi (1838–1898) – early women's rights activist and writer
Tatiana Mamonova (born 1943) – founder of modern Russian women's movement
Nadezhda Stasova (1822–1895) – early women's rights activist
Maria Trubnikova (1835–1897) – early women's rights activist

Saint Vincent and the Grenadines
Nelcia Robinson-Hazell – poet, community organizer and activist

Saudi Arabia
Loujain al-Hathloul (born 1989) – women's rights leader, social media influencer, political prisoner

Serbia
Ksenija Atanasijević (1894–1981) – philosopher, suffragette, first PhD Doctor in Serbian universities 
Helen of Anjou (1236–1314) – queen, feminist, establisher of women schools
Jefimija (1349–1405) – politician, poet, diplomat, feminist
Draga Ljočić (1855–1926) – physician, socialist, and feminist
Milica of Serbia (1335–1405) – empress, feminist, poet
Katarina Milovuk (1844–1913) – educator and women's rights activist
Milunka Savić (1888–1973) – first female combatant, soldier, feminist
Stasa Zajovic (born 1953) – co-founder and coordinator of Women in Black

Slovenia
 Alojzija Štebi (1883–1956) – suffragist, who saw socialism as a means of equalizing society for both men and women.

Somalia
Ayaan Hirsi Ali (born 1969) – Somali-Dutch feminist and atheist activist, writer and politician
Halima Ali Adan – Somali gender rights activist and an expert on female genital mutilation (FGM).

South Africa
Shamima Shaikh (1960–1998) – member of the Muslim Youth Movement of South Africa, exponent of Islamic gender equality

Spain
Concepción Arenal (1820–1893) – feminist and activist
Clara Campoamor (1888–1972) – politician and feminist
Montserrat Cervera Rodon (born 1949) – Catalan anti-militarist, feminist, and women's health activist

Sri-Lanka 
 Rupika De Silva – women's rights activist
 Saila Ithayaraj (born 1977) – women's rights activist, especially for widows
 Shreen Abdul Saroor (born 1969) – women's rights activist

Sweden 

Gertrud Adelborg (1853–1942) – teacher, leading member of the women's rights movement
Sophie Adlersparre (1823–1895) – publisher, women's rights activist, pioneer
Alma Åkermark (1853–1933) – editor, journalist, activist
Ellen Anckarsvärd (1833–1898) – women's rights activist, co-founded Föreningen för gift kvinnas äganderätt (Married Woman's Property Rights Association)
Carolina Benedicks-Bruce (1856–1935) – sculptor, rights activist
Ellen Bergman (1842–1921) – musician, rights activist
Fredrika Bremer (1801–1865) – writer, feminist activist and pioneer
Frigga Carlberg (1851–1925) – writer, feminist and women's suffragist
Maria Cederschiöld (1856–1935) – journalist and women's rights activist
Josefina Deland (1814–1890) – feminist, writer, teacher, founded Svenska lärarinnors pensionsförening (Society for Retired Female Teachers)
Lizinka Dyrssen (1866–1952) – women's rights activist
Agda Montelius (1850–1920) – philanthropist feminist, chairman of the Fredrika Bremer Association
Ebba von Eckermann (1866–1960) – women's rights activist
Ruth Gustafson (1881–1960) – politician, trade unionist, women's rights activist, editor
Anna Hierta-Retzius (1841–1924) – women's rights activist and philanthropist
Lilly Engström (1843–1921) – women's rights activist, government official
Soheila Fors (born 1967) – Iranian-Swedish women's rights activist
Ruth Gustafson (1881–1960) – politician, union worker and women's rights activist
Ellen Hagen (1873–1967) – suffragette, rights activist, politician
Lina Hjort (1881–1959) – schoolteacher, house builder and suffragist
Amanda Kerfstedt (1835–1920) – writer, active in the women's rights movement
Ellen Kleman (1867–1943) – writer, journal editor, women's rights activist
Lotten von Kræmer (1828–1912) – writer, poet, philanthropist, founder of literary society Samfundet De Nio
Elisabeth Krey-Lange (1878–1965) – women's rights activist and journalist
Lisbeth Larsson (1949–2021) – literary historian focusing on gender studies
Rosa Malmström (1906–1995), librarian and feminist
Sara Mohammad (born 1967) – Iraqi Kurdish-born Swedish human rights activist campaigning against honour killing
Agda Montelius (1850–1920) – philanthropist, suffrage activist
Rosalie Olivecrona (1823–1898) – pioneer of the women's rights movement
Ellen Palmstierna (1869–1941) – women's rights and peace activist
Gulli Petrini (1867–1941) – suffragette, women's rights activist, politician
Anna Pettersson (1886–1929) – lawyer and pioneer in legal advice to women
Eva Pineus (1905–1985) – librarian, politician and activist
Emilie Rathou (1862–1948) – journalist, editor, activist
Hilda Sachs (1857–1935) – journalist, writer and feminist
Sophie Sager, (1825–1902) – women's rights activist and writer
Anna Sandström (1854–1931) – educational reformer
Ida Schmidt (1857–1932) – women's rights activist, educator, politician
Alexandra Skoglund (1862–1938) – suffragette, activist, politician
Frida Stéenhoff (1865–1945) – writer, women's rights activist
Elisabeth Tamm (1880–1958) – politician, women's rights activist
Kajsa Wahlberg – Sweden's national rapporteur on human trafficking opposition activities
Anna Whitlock (1852–1930) – school pioneer, journalist and feminist

Switzerland
Marianne Ehrmann (1755–1795) – among first women novelists and publicists in German-speaking countries
Margarethe Faas-Hardegger (1882–1963) – Swiss women's rights activist and trade unionist
Marie Goegg-Pouchoulin (1826–1899) – founder of the Swiss women's movement

Tunisia
Néziha Zarrouk (born 1946) –  minister who contributed to improvements in women's rights and women's health

Turkey
 Nezihe Muhiddin – feminist, founded a women's party
 Sebahat Tuncel – women's rights activist, former nurse and member of Parliament in Turkey

United Kingdom

Lesley Abdela (born 1945) – women's rights campaigner, gender consultant, journalist who has worked for women's representation in over 40 countries including post-conflict countries: Kosovo, Sierra Leone, Iraq, Afghanistan, Nepal, and Aceh. In 1980 she founded the all-Party 300 Group to campaign to get more women into local, national, and European politics in the UK.  Author of hundreds of features in The Guardian, The New York Times, The Independent, and major women's magazines and the paperback Women with X Appeal: Women Politicians in Britain Today (London: Macdonald Optima 1989).
Jane Austen (1775–1817) – writer and feminist, focusing on women's rights and marriage complications through 6 novels
Clementina Black (1853–1922) – writer prominent in the Women's Trade Union League and the forerunner of the Women's Industrial Council
Helen Blackburn (1842–1903) – suffragist and campaigner for women's employment rights
Barbara Bodichon (1827–1891) – active in the Langham Place Circle, promoter of first journal to press for women's rights, the English Woman's Journal (1858–64)
Jessie Boucherett (1825–1905) – co-founder of Society for Promoting the Employment of Women in 1859, editor of Englishwoman's Review (1866–70), co-founder of Women's Employment Defence League in 1891
Myra Sadd Brown (1872–1938) – suffragette, activist for women's rights and internationalist
Constance Bryer (1870–1952) – suffragette who went on hunger strike and was forcibly-fed
Ida Craft (fl. 1910s) – suffragist, among main organizers of Suffrage Hikes
Laura Ormiston Chant (1848–1923) – social reformer, women's rights activist, writer, and member of the International Council of Women (1888)
Emily Davison (1872–1913),n English suffragette
June Eric-Udorie (born 1998) – anti-FGM campaigner
Kate Williams Evans (1866–1961) – suffragette and activist for women's rights
Millicent Fawcett (1847–1929) – suffragist and feminist, president of National Union of Women's Suffrage Societies
Mary Fildes (1789–1876) – political activist and founder of Manchester Female Reform Society
Edith Margaret Garrud (1872–1971) – trained "Bodyguard" unit of Women's Social and Political Union in jujutsu techniques
Katharine Gatty (1870–1952) – journalist, lecturer, militant suffragette
Cicely Hamilton (1872–1952) – English actress, writer, journalist, suffragist, feminist
Diana Reader Harris (1912–1996) – educator and advocate of female ordination in the Church of England
Matilda Hays (1820–1897) – co-founder of first journal to press for women's rights, the English Woman's Journal (1858–64)
Margaret Hills (1892–1967) – organiser of the Election Fighting Fund
Anna Mary Howitt (1824–1884) – feminist prominent in the campaign that led to the Married Women's Property Act 1870
Leyla Hussein – Somali-born British psychotherapist and social activist, co-founder of the Daughters of Eve

Anne Knight (1786–1862) – feminist and social reformer
Priscilla Bright McLaren (1815–1906) – women's rights campaigner
Hannah Mitchell (1872–1956) – suffragette and socialist, author of The Hard Way Up
John Stuart Mill (1806–1873) – philosopher, political economist, author of The Subjection of Women
Elizabeth Montagu (1718–1800) – social reformer and Bluestocking
Olive Morris (1952–1979) – feminist, black nationalist, squatters' rights activist
Caroline Norton (1808–1877) – social campaigner influencing the Custody of Infants Act 1839, Matrimonial Causes Act 1857, and Married Women's Property Act 1870
Christabel Pankhurst (1880–1958) – suffragette, co-founder and leader of Women's Social and Political Union
Emmeline Pankhurst (1858–1928) – founder leader of suffragette movement
Bessie Rayner Parkes (1829–1925) – editor of first journal to press for women's rights, the English Woman's Journal (1858–64)
Pleasance Pendred (1865–1948) – a secretary for the WSPU, writer and speaker for women's suffrage
Dora Russell (1894–1986) – campaigner, advocate of marriage reform, birth control, and female emancipation
Sophia Alexandra Duleep Singh (8 August 1876 – 22 August 1948) – suffragette, involved in the Women's Tax Resistance League
Charlotte Carmichael Stopes (1840–1929) – author and campaigner for women's rights, mother of Marie Stopes
Marie Stopes (1880–1958) – advocate of birth control and equality in marriage
Alice Vickery (1844–1929) – physician, supporter of birth control as means of women's emancipation
Emma Watson (born 1990) – actress, feminist, women's rights activist
Catherine Winkworth (1827–1878) – translator and women's rights activist, secretary of the Clifton Association for Higher Education for Women
Mary Wollstonecraft (1759–1797) – writer and feminist
Malala Yousafzai (born 1997) – see Pakistan
Alice Zimmern (1855–1939) – writer and suffragist

United States

Jane Addams (1860–1935) – major social activist, president Women's International League for Peace and Freedom
Susan B. Anthony (1820–1906) – prominent opponent of slavery, played a pivotal role in the 19th-century women's rights movement to introduce women's suffrage into the United States
Yolanda Bako (born 1946) – New York activist, focused on addressing domestic violence
Helen Valeska Bary (1888–1973) – suffragist, researcher, social reformer
Alice Stone Blackwell (1857–1950) – feminist and journalist, editor of the Woman's Journal, a major women's rights publication
Antoinette Brown Blackwell (1825–1921) – founded American Woman Suffrage Association with Lucy Stone in 1869
Henry Browne Blackwell (1825–1909) – businessman, abolitionist, journalist, suffrage leader and campaigner
Harriot Stanton Blatch (1856–1940) – writer, suffragist, daughter of pioneering women's rights activist Elizabeth Cady Stanton
Amelia Bloomer (1818–1894) – advocate of women's issues, suffragist, publisher and editor of The Lily
Helen Gurley Brown (1922–2012) – author of Sex and the Single Girl, long-time editor of Cosmopolitan, advocate of women's self-fulfillment
Lucy Burns (1879–1966) – suffragist and women's rights activist
Carrie Chapman Catt (1859–1947) – suffragist leader, president of National American Woman Suffrage Association, founder of League of Women Voters and International Alliance of Women
Jacqueline Ceballos (born 1925) – feminist and founder of Veteran Feminists of America
Rebecca Chalker – women's health writer and activist who fought for abortion rights and promoted self-help techniques for women to avoid the gynecologist's office
William Henry Channing (1810–1884) – minister, author
Grace Julian Clarke (1865–1938) – suffragist, journalist, author
Hillary Rodham Clinton (born 1947) – lawyer, professor, author, First Lady, U.S. Senator, U.S. Secretary of State, first female presidential nominee in U.S. history
Mabel Craft Deering (1873–1953) – journalist
Frederick Douglass (1818–1895) – abolitionist, writer, speaker
Virginia Hewlett Douglass (1849–1889) – suffragist
Carol Downer (born 1933) – founder of women's self-help movement, feminist, attorney
Muriel Fox (born 1928) – public relations executive and feminist activist
Elisabeth Freeman (1876–1942) – suffragist, civil rights activist, participated in Suffrage Hikes
Nancy Friday (born 1933) – writer and activist
Betty Friedan (1921–2006) – writer, activist, feminist
Margaret Fuller (1810–1850) – Transcendentalist, advocate of women's education, author of Woman in the Nineteenth Century
Matilda Joslyn Gage (1826–1898) – suffragist, editor, writer, organizer
William Lloyd Garrison (1805–1879) – abolitionist, journalist, organizer, advocate
Ruth Bader Ginsburg (1933–2020) – academic and lawyer for several women's rights cases before the United States Supreme Court; she herself became a Supreme Court Justice in 1993.
Emma Goldman (1869–1940) – campaigner for birth control and other rights
Judy Goldsmith (born 1938) – feminist activist, President of National Organization for Women (NOW)
Helen M. Gougar (1843–1907) – lawyer, temperance and women's rights advocate
Grace Greenwood (1823–1904) – first woman reporter on New York Times, advocate of social reform and women's rights
Thomas Wentworth Higginson (1828–1911) – abolitionist, minister, author
 Marjorie Hillis (1889–1971) – author writing in support of single working women
Isabella Beecher Hooker (1822–1907) – leader, lecturer and activist in the American Suffragist movement
Julia Ward Howe (1818–1910) – suffragist, writer, organizer
Jane Hunt (1812–1889) – philanthropist
Rosalie Gardiner Jones (1883–1978) – suffragist and organizer of the Suffrage Hikes
Abby Kelley (1811–1887) – opponent of slavery, women's rights activist, one of the first women to voice views in public speeches
Kate Kelly (born 1980) – feminist and human rights lawyer, founder of Ordain Women, works for Planned Parenthood
Eva Kotchever (1891–1943) – friend of Emma Goldman, owner of the Eve's Hangout in New York, assassinated at Auschwitz
Mabel Ping-Hua Lee (1896–1966) – suffragist, advocate for women's rights and for the Chinese immigrant community
Mary Livermore (1820–1905) – suffragist and women's rights journalist
Ah Quon McElrath (1915–2008) – labor and women's rights activist
Inez Milholland (1886–1916) – suffragist, key participant in National Woman's Party and Woman Suffrage Parade of 1913
Lee Minto (born 1927) – women's health and rights activist, sex education advocate, former Executive Director of Seattle-King County Planned Parenthood
Janet Mock (born 1983) – writer, transgender rights activist, producer, journalist
Robin Morgan (born 1941) – poet, political theorist, journalist, lecturer
Lucretia Mott (1793–1880) – abolitionist, women's rights activist, social reformer, who helped write Declaration of Sentiments during 1848 Seneca Falls Convention
Pauli Murray (1910–1985) – civil and women's rights activist, lawyer, Episcopal priest
Diane Nash (born 1938) – Civil Rights Movement leader and organizer, voting rights exponent
John Neal (1793–1876) – eccentric, writer and critic, America's first women's rights lecturer
Zelda Kingoff Nordlinger (born 1932) – instigator of first rape-reform laws
Rose O'Neill (1874–1944) – famous illustrator (Kewpie creator) who worked for women's right to vote by creating posters and advertising material to promoting the women's movement
Mary Hutcheson Page (1860–1940) – member of the Boston Equal Suffrage Association for Good Government, National American Woman Suffrage Association, and National Executive Committee of the Congressional Union for Women Suffrage, 1910 President of the National Woman Suffrage Association
Maud Wood Park (1871–1955) – founder College Equal Suffrage League, first president League of Women Voters
Adele Parker (1870–1956) – ardent suffragist, 1903 University of Washington law school graduate, 1911-1913 owned and operated the Western Woman Voter newspaper, 1934 House Representative 37th District in WA
Deborah Parker (born 1970) – major player in the Violence Against Women Reauthorization Act of 2013 and activist for indigenous women's rights
Alice Paul (1885–1977) – one of the leaders of the 1910s Women's Voting Rights Movement for the 19th Amendment, founder of National Woman's Party, initiator of Silent Sentinels and 1913 Women's Suffrage Parade, author of the proposed Equal Rights Amendment
Frédérique Petrides (1903–1983) – see Belgium
Wendell Phillips (1811–1884) – abolitionist, orator, lawyer
Mónica Ramírez – author, civil rights attorney, speaker
Margaret Sanger (1879–1966) – writer, nurse, founder American Birth Control League, founder and first president of Planned Parenthood
May Wright Sewall (1844–1920) – educator, feminist, president of National Council of Women for the United States, president of the International Council of Women
Anna Howard Shaw (1847–1919) – president of National Women's Suffrage Association
Pauline Agassiz Shaw (1841–1917) – founder president of Boston Equal Suffrage Association for Good Government
Eleanor Smeal (born 1939) – organizer, initiator, president of NOW, founder and president of the Feminist Majority Foundation
Elizabeth Cady Stanton (1815–1902) – social activist, abolitionist, suffragist, organizer of 1848 Women's Rights Convention, co-founder of National Woman Suffrage Association and International Council of Women
Gloria Steinem (born 1934) – writer, activist, feminist, women's rights journalist
Doris Stevens (1892–1963) – organizer for National American Women Suffrage Association and National Woman's Party, Silent Sentinels participant, author of Jailed for Freedom
Lucy Stone (1818–1893) – orator, one of the initiators of the first National Women's Rights Convention, founder of Woman's Journal, force behind the American Woman Suffrage Association, noted for retaining her surname after marriage
Roshini Thinakaran – film-maker focusing on lives of women in post-conflict zones
Dorothy Thompson (1893–1961) – Buffalo and New York suffragist, later journalist and radio broadcaster 
Sojourner Truth (c. 1797–1883) – abolitionist, women's rights activist and speaker
Ella Lillian Wall Van Leer (1892–1986) – American artist, architect, women's rights activist
Maryly Van Leer Peck (1930–2011) – academic, first female engineer at Vanderbilt University, pioneer, women's rights activist and board member of Society of Women Engineers
Frances Willard (1839–1898) – long-time president of the Woman's Christian Temperance Union, which, under her leadership, supported women's suffrage
Mabel Vernon (1883–1975) – suffragist, member of Congressional Union for Women Suffrage, organizer for Silent Sentinels
Ida B. Wells (1862–1931) – civil rights and anti-lynching activist, journalist, educator, suffragist noted for refusal to avoid media attention as an African American
Victoria Woodhull (1838–1927) – suffragist, eugenicist, publisher, organizer, first woman to run for U.S. presidency

Uruguay
María Abella de Ramírez (1863–1926) – feminist noted for her role in establishing Uruguayan and Argentine women's groups in the early 1900s

Venezuela
Sheyene Gerardi – human rights advocate, peace activist, founder of the SPACE movement

Yemen
Muna Luqman – activist, peace builder, founder of the organization Food4Humanity and co-founder of Women in Solidarity Network

Zimbabwe
Talent Jumo (born 1980/1981) – teacher, co-founder and director of the Katswe Sistahood

See also

History of Feminism
List of civil rights leaders
List of feminists
List of suffragists and suffragettes
List of women pacifists and peace activists
List of women's rights organizations
Timeline of first women's suffrage in majority-Muslim countries
Timeline of women's rights (other than voting)
Timeline of women's suffrage
Women's suffrage organizations

References

Women's rights activists
Lists of women
Women's rights activists
Womens Rights Activists